The  Tietê River (Portuguese, Rio Tietê) is a Brazilian river in the state of São Paulo.

The name Tietê was registered for the first time on a map published in 1748 by d’Anville. The name signifies "The truthful  river", or "truthful waters” in Tupi.

Source

The rivers' headwaters are in the Serra do Mar, to the east of São Paulo city.

In the municipality of Salesópolis, it encounters one of the first hydroelectric power stations constructed in Brazil, "Usina Parque de Salesópolis", constructed in 1912 by the old São Paulo Tramway, Light and Power Company. It generated energy from an artificial waterfall with the water dropping a height of 72m.

Navigation on the waterway Tietê-Paraná

Several dams ( for instance the Barra Bonita ) on the river have ship locks to ensure that navigation on the river is possible. All river ship freight including such commodities like sand, gravel, and sugarcane, total approximately 2 million metric tons. (source : DNIT)
About  of the Tietê River is fully navigable

Pollution and environmental degradation 

Although the Tiete River is said to be one of the most important rivers economically for the state of São Paulo and for the country, the Tietê River is best known for its environmental problems, especially for the stretch through the city of São Paulo. 

The pollution of the Tietê River did not start long ago. Even in the 1960s, the river still had fish in the stretch within the capital. However, the environmental degradation of the Tietê River started subtly in the 1920s with the construction of the Guarapiranga Reservoir, by the Canadian firm  São Paulo Tramway, Light and Power Company, for the later generation of electrical energy in the hydroelectric power stations Edgar de Souza and Rasgão, situated in Santana de Parnaíba. This intervention altered the regime of the waters in the capital and was accompanied with some rectification works also by the São Paulo Tramway, Light and Power Company, which left the bed of the river less winding, in the region between Vila Maria and “Freguesia do Ó.”

Even in the 1920s and 1930s, the river was utilised for fishing and sports activities were famous as were the nautical races on the river. During this period boat race clubs were created along the length of the river, such as the Club of the Tietê races and the Espéria, clubs that exist till now.

In September 2010 National Geographic identified the river as the most polluted in Brazil.

Several species from the Tietê River are considered threatened and one of these, the catfish Heptapterus multiradiatus, is possibly already extinct.

The Tietê project 

The governor of São Paulo ordered Sabesp, the company responsible for sanitation in the state, to establish a program to clean up the river. The state at the same time sought help at the Inter American Development Bank, and proposed a project based on the former studies of SANEGRAN.

After more than 16 years, the cleaning up of the River Tietê is still far short of desired levels, but encouraging progress has been made. At the end of the 1990s, the capacity of sewage treatment has been expanded: Sabesp has expanded the treatment capacity of the Wastewater Treatment Plant in Barueri, and the Seasons of the Sewage Treatment at San Miguel, to treat the rest of the sewage of the city of São Paulo.

Tributaries of the Tietê River

 Pinheiros River
 Tamanduateí River
 Aricanduva River
 Baquirivu-Guaçu River
 Batalha River
 Bauru River
 Biritiba-Mirim River
 Capivara River
 Capivari River
 Cotia River
 Dourado River
 Jacaré-Guaçu River
 Jacaré-Pepira River
 Jaú River
 Jundiaí River
 Piracicaba River
 São Lourenço River
 Sorocaba River

Images

See also
 Jacaré-Guaçu River
 Piracicaba River

References

Tributaries of the Paraná River
Rivers of São Paulo (state)